The Mudlark is a 1950 film made in Britain by 20th Century Fox. It is a fictional account of how Queen Victoria was eventually brought out of her mourning for her dead husband, Prince Albert. It was directed by Jean Negulesco, written and produced by Nunnally Johnson and based on the 1949 novel of the same name by American artillery sergeant and San Francisco newspaperman Theodore Bonnet (1908–1983). It stars Irene Dunne, Alec Guinness and Andrew Ray.

"Mudlarks" were street children who survived by scavenging and selling what they could find on the banks of the River Thames. The film was a hit in Britain and made an overnight star of Andrew Ray, who played the title character.

Plot
A young street urchin named Wheeler, half-starved, homeless and an orphan, finds a cameo containing the likeness of Queen Victoria. Not recognising her, he is told that she is the "mother of all England". Taking the remark literally, he journeys to Windsor Castle to see her.

He manages to sneak in, and is first spotted by a sympathetic maid, Kate Noonan, but before she can safely see him out, he is forced to hide in the dining room when the Queen enters. He falls asleep, and is discovered by his snoring during the meal. Caught (and forcibly bathed), the frightened boy is questioned by John Brown, the Queen's friend and confidant, who soon sees he is not part of any plot against the Queen. On his own (non-existent) authority, he takes the lad on a tour of the castle, even drunkenly encouraging the boy to sit on the throne. The more sober authorities catch up with them, and take the boy into custody for interrogation. He ends up spending Christmas in the Tower of London. Wild rumours circulate among the general public.

Prime Minister Benjamin Disraeli has been unsuccessful in persuading the widowed Victoria to end her seclusion following the death of her husband 15 years before. Disraeli sees an opportunity to change her mind and pleads for Wheeler and those like him in Parliament, delivering a speech that indirectly criticizes the Queen for withdrawing from public life. The Queen is infuriated by his action, and tells him so to his face. She refuses to become more accessible to her subjects, despite Brown's urging, but when Wheeler shows up once more, she is genuinely moved upon meeting the boy for the first time, and once again enters public life.

In a subplot, Lady Emily Prior and Lieutenant Charles McHatten, a Guards officer, are in love, but the Queen is opposed to the relationship because of McHattan's social position. The couple try to elope twice, but each time McHatten is called away on business related to the boy. The Queen eventually relents, and the third attempt at elopement succeeds.

Cast
 Irene Dunne as Queen Victoria
 Alec Guinness as Benjamin Disraeli
 Andrew Ray as Wheeler
 Beatrice Campbell as Lady Emily Prior
 Finlay Currie as John Brown, Queen Victoria's servant (gillie)
 Anthony Steel as Lieutenant Charles McHatten
 Raymond Lovell as Sergeant Footman Naseby
 Marjorie Fielding as Lady Margaret Prior
 Constance Smith as Kate Noonan
 Edward Rigby as The Watchman
 Ernest Clark as Hammond
 Wilfrid Hyde-White as Tucker

Award nomination
The Mudlark was nominated for the Academy Award for Best Costume Design in a black-and-white film (Edward Stevenson and Margaret Furse).

Historical inspiration
In Theodore Bonnet's semi-historical novel upon which this film was based, the story of the young mudlark Wheeler (aged ten in the film, but seven in the book) sneaking into Windsor Castle in 1875 to see Queen Victoria was inspired by a 14 December 1838 incident involving "the boy Jones", as newspapers called him. A boy was discovered in Buckingham Palace. At first mistaken for a chimney-sweep, until he ran off across the lawns, he was apprehended by a policeman. (Sweeping of chimneys by boys was not made illegal until 1840.)

The boy gave his name as Edward Cotton and said that he had been born in the palace; later he claimed to have been living there for only a year, after having come from Hertfordshire. In fact, his name was Edward Jones, the 14-year-old son of a tailor who lived in Bell Yard, some 300 yards distant from the palace. The tailor had turned him out for ill conduct. He had been employed as an errand boy by a carver and gilder in Coventry Street, but had disappeared three days previous to his arrest after saying that he wanted to see the palace's Grand Staircase to sketch it and also to see the Queen (who was actually then at Windsor).

At the Westminster Sessions on 28 December, the magistrate's court jury found him not guilty of theft and he was taken back by his employer, who described him as an extremely good lad. (Some details were taken from contemporary reports in the London newspapers The Times, The Sun and The Standard.)

The novel
The Mudlark refers to the seven-year-old waif from the East End but it also could be said to figuratively refer to the British PM Disraeli who came from humble beginnings, and whose life is described in some detail. The novel also manages to give a personality to the Fenians and the Irish question, it includes two love affairs as well as the latitude given by Queen Victoria to her Scottish gillie Brown and the relationship between Victoria and her subjects. It also includes the beginnings of enlightened social reform through parliamentary action, and the further extension of British world influence and of Britain's imperial power in India. And for added humour, some bureaucratic overlap and exaggerated suspicions.

Production
Anthony Steel had just become a film name in The Wooden Horse.

References

External links
 
 
 
 
Review of film at Variety

1950 films
1950 drama films
British black-and-white films
British drama films
Films about orphans
Films about prime ministers of the United Kingdom
Films directed by Jean Negulesco
Films based on American novels
20th Century Fox films
Cultural depictions of Queen Victoria on film
Cultural depictions of Benjamin Disraeli
Films with screenplays by Nunnally Johnson
Films scored by William Alwyn
1950s English-language films
1950s British films